The 1930–31 New York Rangers season was the franchise's fifth season. In the regular season, the Rangers finished third in the American Division with a 19–16–9 record. New York qualified for the Stanley Cup playoffs, where the Rangers defeated the Montreal Maroons 8–1 in a two-game, total goals series, but lost to the Chicago Black Hawks 3 goals to 0 in the semi-finals.

Regular season

Final standings

Record vs. opponents

Schedule and results

|- align="center" bgcolor="#CCFFCC"
| 1 || 11 || @ Philadelphia Quakers || 3–0 || 1–0–0
|- align="center" bgcolor="#FFBBBB"
| 2 || 13 || @ Detroit Falcons || 1–0 || 1–1–0
|- align="center" bgcolor="white"
| 3 || 16 || @ Chicago Black Hawks || 1 – 1 OT || 1–1–1
|- align="center" bgcolor="white"
| 4 || 18 || New York Americans || 0 – 0 OT || 1–1–2
|- align="center" bgcolor="#CCFFCC"
| 5 || 23 || Philadelphia Quakers || 5–2 || 2–1–2
|- align="center" bgcolor="#FFBBBB"
| 6 || 25 || @ Montreal Maroons || 5–2 || 2–2–2
|- align="center" bgcolor="#FFBBBB"
| 7 || 27 || Chicago Black Hawks || 4–0 || 2–3–2
|- align="center" bgcolor="#CCFFCC"
| 8 || 29 || @ Philadelphia Quakers || 6–3 || 3–3–2
|-

|- align="center" bgcolor="#FFBBBB"
| 9 || 4 || @ Montreal Canadiens || 5–4 || 3–4–2
|- align="center" bgcolor="#FFBBBB"
| 10 || 6 || @ Toronto Maple Leafs || 4–2 || 3–5–2
|- align="center" bgcolor="#CCFFCC"
| 11 || 9 || Ottawa Senators || 3–2 || 4–5–2
|- align="center" bgcolor="#CCFFCC"
| 12 || 14 || Detroit Falcons || 3–0 || 5–5–2
|- align="center" bgcolor="#FFBBBB"
| 13 || 18 || Boston Bruins || 4–2 || 5–6–2
|- align="center" bgcolor="white"
| 14 || 20 || @ Boston Bruins || 2 – 2 OT || 5–6–3
|- align="center" bgcolor="#CCFFCC"
| 15 || 23 || Montreal Canadiens || 5–1 || 6–6–3
|- align="center" bgcolor="#CCFFCC"
| 16 || 25 || @ Ottawa Senators || 4–1 || 7–6–3
|- align="center" bgcolor="#CCFFCC"
| 17 || 28 || Philadelphia Quakers || 4–2 || 8–6–3
|- align="center" bgcolor="white"
| 18 || 30 || @ New York Americans || 2 – 2 OT || 8–6–4
|-

|- align="center" bgcolor="#FFBBBB"
| 19 || 1 || Boston Bruins || 4 – 3 OT || 8–7–4
|- align="center" bgcolor="#CCFFCC"
| 20 || 6 || Montreal Maroons || 5–1 || 9–7–4
|- align="center" bgcolor="#CCFFCC"
| 21 || 8 || @ Detroit Falcons || 1–0 || 10–7–4
|- align="center" bgcolor="#FFBBBB"
| 22 || 11 || Chicago Black Hawks || 2–0 || 10–8–4
|- align="center" bgcolor="white"
| 23 || 13 || @ Boston Bruins || 2 – 2 OT || 10–8–5
|- align="center" bgcolor="white"
| 24 || 15 || Toronto Maple Leafs || 1 – 1 OT || 10–8–6
|- align="center" bgcolor="#FFBBBB"
| 25 || 18 || @ Chicago Black Hawks || 2–1 || 10–9–6
|- align="center" bgcolor="#FFBBBB"
| 26 || 20 || Montreal Canadiens || 3 – 2 OT || 10–10–6
|- align="center" bgcolor="#FFBBBB"
| 27 || 25 || Detroit Falcons || 1–0 || 10–11–6
|- align="center" bgcolor="#FFBBBB"
| 28 || 29 || Boston Bruins || 4–3 || 10–12–6
|- align="center" bgcolor="white"
| 29 || 31 || @ Montreal Maroons || 2 – 2 OT || 10–12–7
|-

|- align="center" bgcolor="#CCFFCC"
| 30 || 3 || Montreal Maroons || 3–0 || 11–12–7
|- align="center" bgcolor="#CCFFCC"
| 31 || 5 || @ New York Americans || 2–0 || 12–12–7
|- align="center" bgcolor="#FFBBBB"
| 32 || 8 || Chicago Black Hawks || 3–2 || 12–13–7
|- align="center" bgcolor="#CCFFCC"
| 33 || 10 || @ Philadelphia Quakers || 3–1 || 13–13–7
|- align="center" bgcolor="white"
| 34 || 12 || @ Detroit Falcons || 1 – 1 OT || 13–13–8
|- align="center" bgcolor="#CCFFCC"
| 35 || 15 || @ Chicago Black Hawks || 2–1 || 14–13–8
|- align="center" bgcolor="#FFBBBB"
| 36 || 17 || Ottawa Senators || 5–4 || 14–14–8
|- align="center" bgcolor="#CCFFCC"
| 37 || 22 || Philadelphia Quakers || 6–1 || 15–14–8
|- align="center" bgcolor="#CCFFCC"
| 38 || 26 || Toronto Maple Leafs || 4–1 || 16–14–8
|-

|- align="center" bgcolor="#FFBBBB"
| 39 || 3 || @ Boston Bruins || 4–1 || 16–15–8
|- align="center" bgcolor="#CCFFCC"
| 40 || 5 || @ Montreal Canadiens || 2–1 || 17–15–8
|- align="center" bgcolor="#FFBBBB"
| 41 || 7 || @ Toronto Maple Leafs || 5–2 || 17–16–8
|- align="center" bgcolor="#CCFFCC"
| 42 || 10 || Detroit Falcons || 3 – 2 OT || 18–16–8
|- align="center" bgcolor="white"
| 43 || 15 || New York Americans || 0 – 0 OT || 18–16–9
|- align="center" bgcolor="#CCFFCC"
| 44 || 17 || @ Ottawa Senators || 3–1 || 19–16–9
|-

Playoffs

Key:  Win  Loss

Player statistics
Skaters

Goaltenders

†Denotes player spent time with another team before joining Rangers. Stats reflect time with Rangers only.
‡Traded mid-season. Stats reflect time with Rangers only.

See also
1930–31 NHL season

References

 
1930–31 New York Rangers Statistics
New York Rangers 1930–1931 Season

New York Rangers seasons
New York Rangers
New York Rangers
New York Rangers
New York Rangers
Madison Square Garden
1930s in Manhattan